Aposymbiosis occurs when symbiotic organisms live apart from one another (for example, a clownfish living independently of a sea anemone).  Studies have shown that the lifecycles of both the host and the symbiont are affected in some way, usually negative, and that for obligate symbiosis the effects can be drastic. Aposymbiosis is distinct from exsymbiosis, which occurs when organisms are recently separated from a symbiotic association. Because symbionts can be vertically transmitted from parent to offspring or horizontally transmitted from the environment, the presence of an aposymbiotic state suggests that transmission of the symbiont is horizontal.  A classical example of a symbiotic relationship with an aposymbiotic state is the Hawaiian bobtail squid Euprymna scolopes and the bioluminescent bacteria Vibrio fischeri. While the nocturnal squid hunts, the bacteria emit light of similar intensity of the moon which camouflages the squid from predators. Juveniles are colonized within hours of hatching and Vibrio must outcompete other bacteria in the seawater through a system of recognition and infection.

Use in research 
Aposymbiotic organisms can be used as models to observe a variety of processes. Aposymbiotic Euprymna juveniles have been studied throughout colonization in order to determine the system of recognizing Vibrio fischeri in seawater. Coral polyps without their symbiont algae are models for coral calcification and the effects of the algae on coral pH regulation. 

Aposymbiotic insects are used to model insect-bacteria relationships and modes of infection. These models are also used in arthropod vectors and disease transmission. Wolbachia species are common insect endosymbionts and investigation into this species has yielded potential human health implications. Additionally, aposymbiotic wasps without Wolbachia are unable to reproduce. This relationship between Asobara tabida wasps and Wolbachia is an important model for insect microbiome study.

Health 
Women who are aposymbiotic for certain Lactobacillus species are more susceptible to urinary tract infections and bacterial vaginosis. Additionally, these Lactobacilli are of interest for use as a probiotic therapeutic alternative to antibiotics.

Aposymbiotic vectors, especially insects, have been used to study disease transmission. Furthermore, aposymbiotic and dysbiotic vectors are being engineered to change the rate and efficiency of disease transmission. Arthropod infection with Wolbachia can cause sterility and inhibit the transmission of vector-borne diseases.

See also

References

Symbiosis